Luangwa District is a district of Zambia, located in Lusaka Province. As of the 2020 Zambian Census, the district had a population of 31,007 people.

Luangwa District is bordered by two Rivers; Luangwa river on the east of the district and forms the border between the district and Mozambique. South of the district is the mighty Zambezi river which forms the border between Luangwa District and Zimbabwe as it flows eastswards to come into being the confluence with Luangwa river, then continuing to flow as Zambezi river.

This mostly forested district includes multiple hills. Luangwa District is home to Zambezi escarpment, which stretches through the Lower zambezi National Park. The district is thought to have been the earliest settlement of Europeans in the country, known then as Feira, before 1964. It has rich history and is home to two liberation sites - in Kavalamanja and Kakaro villages of the district. Besides that, the crossing of the Ngoni people fleeing from Shaka of the Zulu, was done at the confluence in the district as it was epically met with the eclipse at the time of crossing. The district has a number of national monuments.

References

Districts of Lusaka Province